This is a list of foreign ministers in 2017.

Africa
 
Ramtane Lamamra (2013–2017)
Abdelkader Messahel (2017–2019)
  - 
Georges Rebelo Chicoti (2010–2017)
Manuel Domingos Augusto (2017–2020)
  - Aurélien Agbénonci (2016–present)
  - Pelonomi Venson-Moitoi (2014–2018)
  - Alpha Barry (2016–2021)
  - Alain Aimé Nyamitwe   (2015–2018)
 -  Lejeune Mbella Mbella (2015–present)
  - Luís Felipe Tavares (2016–2021)
  - Charles-Armel Doubane (2016–present)
  -
Moussa Faki (2008–2017)
Hissein Brahim Taha (2017)
Mahamat Zene Cherif (2017–2020)
  -
Mohamed Bacar Dossar (2016–2017)
Mohamed El-Amine Souef (2017–2020)
  - Jean-Claude Gakosso (2015–present)
  - Léonard She Okitundu (2016–2019)
  - Mahamoud Ali Youssouf (2005–present)
  - Sameh Shoukry (2014–present)
  - Agapito Mba Mokuy (2012–2018)
  - Osman Saleh Mohammed (2007–present)
  - Workneh Gebeyehu (2016–2019)
  -
Pacôme Moubelet-Boubeya (2016–2017)
Noël Nelson Messone (2017–2018)
  -
 Neneh MacDouall-Gaye (2015–2017)
 Yahya Jammeh (2017)
 Ousainou Darboe (2017–2018)
  -
Hanna Tetteh (2013–2017)
Shirley Ayorkor Botchway (2017–present)
  
Makalé Camara (2016–2017)
Mamadi Touré (2017–2021)
  - Jorge Malú (2016–2018)
  - Marcel Amon Tanoh (acting to 2017) (2016–2020)
  - Amina Mohamed (2013=2018)
  -
'Mamphono Khaketla (2016–2017)
Lesego Makgothi (2017–2020)
  - Marjon Kamara (2016–2018)

Government of  House of Representatives of Libya (Government of Libya internationally recognized to 2016) - Mohammed al-Dairi (2014–2019)
 Government of National Accord of Libya (Interim government internationally recognized as the sole legitimate government of Libya from 2016) - Mohamed Taha Siala (2016–2021)
  -
Béatrice Atallah (2015–2017)
Henry Rabary Njaka (2017–2018)
  -
Francis Kasaila (2016–2017)
Emmanuel Fabiano (2017–2019)
  -
Abdoulaye Diop (2014–2017)
Tiéman Coulibaly (2017–2018)
  - Isselkou Ould Ahmed Izid Bih (2016–2018)
  - Vishnu Lutchmeenaraidoo (2016–2019)
  -
Salaheddine Mezouar (2013–2017)
Nasser Bourita  (2017–present)
  -
Oldemiro Balói (2008–2017)
José Condungua Pacheco (2017–2020)
  - Netumbo Nandi-Ndaitwah (2012–present)
  - Ibrahim Yacouba (2016–2018)
  - Geoffrey Onyeama (2015–present)
  - Louise Mushikiwabo (2009–2018)
  - Urbino Botelho (2016–2018)
  -
 Mankeur Ndiaye (2012–2017)
 Sidiki Kaba (2017–2019)
  - Danny Faure (2016–2018)
  -
Samura Kamara (2012–2017)
Kaifala Marah (2017–2018)
  -
Abdisalam Omer (2015–2017)
Yusuf Garaad Omar (2017–2018)
  - Saad Ali Shire (2015–2018)
  - Maite Nkoana-Mashabane (2009–2018)
  - Deng Alor (2016–2018)
  - Ibrahim Ghandour (2015–2018)
  – Mgwagwa Gamedze (2013–2018)
  - Augustine Mahiga (2015–2019)
  - Robert Dussey (2013–present)
  - Khemaies Jhinaoui (2016–2019)
  - Sam Kutesa (2005–2021)
  - Mohamed Salem Ould Salek (1998–2023)
  - Harry Kalaba (2014–2018)
  -
Simbarashe Mumbengegwi (2005–2017)
Walter Mzembi (2017)
Simbarashe Mumbengegwi (acting) (2017)
Sibusiso Moyo (2017–2021)

Asia
  - Daur Kove (2016–2021)
  - Salahuddin Rabbani (2015–2019)
  - Eduard Nalbandyan (2008-2018)
  - Elmar Mammadyarov (2004–2020)
  - Sheikh Khalid ibn Ahmad Al Khalifah (2005–2020)
  - Abul Hassan Mahmud Ali (2014–2019)
  - Damcho Dorji (2015-2018)
  - Hassanal Bolkiah (2015–present)
  - Prak Sokhon (2016–present)
  - Wang Yi (2013–present)
  -
Hernâni Coelho (2015–2017)
Aurélio Guterres (2017–2018)
  - Mikheil Janelidze (2015–2018)
  - Sushma Swaraj (2014–2019)
  - Retno Marsudi (2014–present)
  - Mohammad Javad Zarif (2013–2021)
  - Ibrahim al-Jaafari (2014–2018)
  - Falah Mustafa Bakir (2006–2019)
  - Benjamin Netanyahu (2015–2019)
  - 
 Fumio Kishida (2012–2017)
 Tarō Kōno (2017–2019)
  -
Nasser Judeh (2009–2017)
Ayman Safadi (2017–present)
  – Kairat Abdrakhmanov (2016–2018)
  - Ri Yong-ho (2016–2020)
  -
 Yun Byung-se (2013–2017)
 Kang Kyung-wha (2017–2021)
  - Sheikh Sabah Al-Khalid Al-Sabah (2011–2019)
  - Erlan Abdyldayev (2012–2018)
  - Saleumxay Kommasith (2016–present)
  - Gebran Bassil (2014–2020)
  - Anifah Aman (2009-2018)
  - Mohamed Asim (2016–2018)
  -
Tsend Munkh-Orgil (2016–2017)
Damdin Tsogtbaatar (2017–2020)
  - Aung San Suu Kyi (2016–2021)
  -
 Prakash Sharan Mahat (2016–2017)
 Krishna Bahadur Mahara (2017)
 Sher Bahadur Deuba (2017–2018)
  - Yusuf bin Alawi bin Abdullah (1982–2020)
  -
Sartaj Aziz (2013-2017)
Khawaja Muhammad Asif (2017–2018)
  - Riyad al-Maliki (2007–present)
  -
Perfecto R. Yasay, Jr. (2016–2017)
Enrique Manalo (acting) (2017)
Alan Peter Cayetano (2017–2018)
  - Sheikh Mohammed bin Abdulrahman Al Thani (2016–present)

  - Adel al-Jubeir (2015–2018)
  - Vivian Balakrishnan (2015–present)
  -
Murat Dzhoiev (2016–2017)
Dmitry Medoyev (2017–present)
  -
 Mangala Samaraweera (2015–2017)
 Ravi Karunanayake (2017)
 Wasantha Senanayake (acting) (2017)
 Tilak Marapana (2017–2018)
  - Walid Muallem (2006–2020)
  - David Lee (2016–2018)
  - Sirodjidin Aslov (2013–present)
  - Don Pramudwinai (2015–present)
  - Mevlüt Çavuşoğlu (2015–present)
  - Raşit Meredow (2001–present)
  - Sheikh Abdullah bin Zayed Al Nahyan (2006–present)
  - Abdulaziz Komilov (2012–present)
  - Phạm Bình Minh (2011–2021)

Republic of Yemen - Abdulmalik Al-Mekhlafi (2015–2018)
Supreme Political Council (unrecognised, rival government) - Hisham Abdullah (2016-present)

Europe
  - Ditmir Bushati (2013–2019)
  - 
Gilbert Saboya Sunyé (2011–2017)
Maria Ubach i Font (2017–present)
  -
Sebastian Kurz (2013–2017)
Karin Kneissl (2017–2019)
  - Vladimir Makei (2012–present)
  - Didier Reynders (2011–2019)
  - Guy Vanhengel (2013–2019)
  - Geert Bourgeois (2014–2019)
  Wallonia -
Paul Magnette (2014–2017)
Willy Borsus (2017–2019)
  - Igor Crnadak (2015–2019)
  -
Daniel Mitov (2014–2017)
Radi Naidenov (2017)
Ekaterina Zakharieva (2017–2021)
  -
 Davor Ivo Stier (2016–2017)
 Marija Pejčinović Burić (2017–2019)
  - Ioannis Kasoulidis (2013–2018)
  -
Lubomír Zaorálek (2014–2017)
Martin Stropnický (2017–2018)
  - Anders Samuelsen (2016–2019)
  - Poul Michelsen (2015–2019)
  Donetsk People's Republic - Natalya Nikonorova (acting) (2016–present)
  - Sven Mikser (2016–2019)
  - Timo Soini (2015–2019)
  -
Jean-Marc Ayrault (2016–2017)
Jean-Yves Le Drian (2017–present)
  -
Frank-Walter Steinmeier (2013–2017)
Sigmar Gabriel (2017–2018)
  - Nikos Kotzias (2015–2018)
  - Jonathan Le Tocq (2016–present)
  - Péter Szijjártó (2014–present)
  -
 Lilja Dögg Alfreðsdóttir (2016–2017)
 Guðlaugur Þór Þórðarson (2017–2021)
  - 
Charles Flanagan (2014-2017)
Simon Coveney (2017–present)
  - Angelino Alfano (2016–2018)
  - Sir Philip Bailhache (2013–2018)
  -
Enver Hoxhaj (2016–2017)
Emanuel Demaj (acting) (2017)
Behgjet Pacolli (2017–2020)
  - Edgars Rinkēvičs (2011–present)
  - Aurelia Frick (2009–2019)
  - Linas Antanas Linkevičius (2012–2020)
  Lugansk People's Republic - Vladislav Deinevo (acting) (2017–present)
  - Jean Asselborn (2004–present)
  -
Nikola Poposki (2011–2017)
Nikola Dimitrov (2017–2020)
  -
George Vella (2013–2017)
Carmelo Abela (2017–2020)
  - Andrei Galbur (2016–2017)
  Gagauzia - Vitaliy Vlah (2015–present)
  - Gilles Tonelli (2015–2019)
  - Srđan Darmanović (2016–2020)
  - 
Bert Koenders (2014–2017)
Halbe Zijlstra (2017–2018)
  -
Børge Brende (2013–2017)
Ine Marie Eriksen Søreide (2017–present)
  - Witold Waszczykowski (2015–2018)
  - Augusto Santos Silva (2015–2022)
  -
Lazăr Comănescu (2015–2017)
Teodor Meleșcanu (2017–2019)
  - Sergey Lavrov (2004–present)
  - Nicola Renzi (2016–2020)
  - Ivica Dačić (2014–2020)
  - Miroslav Lajčák (2012–2020)
  - Karl Erjavec (2012–2018)
  - Alfonso Dastis (2016–2018)
   - Raül Romeva (2016–2017)
  - Margot Wallström (2014–2019)
  
Didier Burkhalter (2012–2017)
Ignazio Cassis (2017–present)
  - Vitaly Ignatyev (2015–present)

  - Pavlo Klimkin (2014–2019)
  - Boris Johnson (2016–2018)
  - Archbishop Paul Gallagher (2014–present)

North America and the Caribbean
  - Charles Fernandez (2014–2018)
  -
Fred Mitchell (2012–2017)
Darren Henfield (2017–2021)
  - Maxine McClean (2008–2018)
  - Wilfred Elrington (2008–2020)
  -
Stéphane Dion (2015–2017)
Chrystia Freeland (2017–2019)
  Quebec - Christine St-Pierre (2014–2018)
  - Manuel González Sanz (2014–2018)
  - Bruno Rodríguez Parrilla (2009–present)
  - Francine Baron (2014–2019)
  - Miguel Vargas Maldonado (2016–2020)
  - Hugo Martínez (2014–2018)
  Greenland -
Vittus Qujaukitsoq (2014–2017)
Suka K. Frederiksen (2017–2018)
  - Elvin Nimrod (2016–2018)
 - 
 Carlos Raúl Morales (2014–2017)
 Sandra Jovel (2017–2020)
  -
Pierrot Delienne (2016–2017)
Antonio Rodrigue (2017–2018)
  - María Dolores Agüero (2016–2019)
  - Kamina Johnson-Smith (2016–present)
  -
Claudia Ruiz Massieu (2015–2017)
Luis Videgaray Caso (2017–2018)
  -
Samuel Santos López (2007–2017)
Denis Moncada (2017–present)
  - Isabel Saint Malo (2014–2019)
  –
Víctor Suárez Meléndez (2015–2017)
Luis G. Rivera Marín (2017–2019)
  - Mark Brantley (2015–present)
  - Allen Chastanet (2016–2021)
  - Sir Louis Straker (2015–2020)
  - Dennis Moses (2015–present)
  -
John Kerry (2013–2017)
Tom Shannon (acting) (2017)
Rex Tillerson (2017–2018)

Oceania
  - Julie Bishop (2013–2018)
  - Henry Puna (2013–2020)
  - Frank Bainimarama (2016–2019)
   - Édouard Fritch (2014–present)
  - Taneti Mamau (2016–present)
  - John Silk (2016–2020)
  - Lorin S. Robert (2007–2019)
  - Baron Waqa (2013–2019)
  -
Murray McCully (2008–2017)
Gerry Brownlee (2017)
Winston Peters (2017–2020)
  - Toke Talagi (2008–2020)
  -
Billy Kuartei (2013–2017)
Faustina Rehuher-Marugg (2017–2021)
  - Rimbink Pato (2012–2019)
  - Tuilaepa Aiono Sailele Malielegaoi (1998–2021)
  - Milner Tozaka (2014–2019)
  -
Afega Gaualofa (2016–2017)
Siopili Perez (2017–2018)
  -
ʻAkilisi Pōhiva (2014–2017)
Siaosi Sovaleni (2017–present)
  - Taukelina Finikaso (2013–2018)
  -
Bruno Leingkone (2016–2017)
Ralph Regenvanu (2017–2020)

South America
  -
Susana Malcorra (2015–2017)
Jorge Faurie (2017–2019)
  -
David Choquehuanca (2006–2017)
Fernando Huanacuni Mamani (2017–2018)
  -
José Serra (2016–2017)
Marcos Galvão (acting) (2017)
Aloysio Nunes (2017–2019)
  - Heraldo Muñoz (2014–2018)
  - María Ángela Holguín (2010-2017)
  -
 Guillaume Long (2016–2017)
 María Fernanda Espinosa (2017–2018)
  - Carl Greenidge (2015–2019)
  - Eladio Loizaga (2013–2018)
  - Ricardo Luna (2016–2018)
  -
 Niermala Badrising (2015–2017)
 Yldiz Pollack-Beighle (2017–2020)
  - Rodolfo Nin Novoa (2015–2020)
  -
 Delcy Rodríguez (2014–2017)
 Samuel Moncada (2017)
 Jorge Arreaza (2017–2021)

See also
List of current foreign ministers

References

External links
http://rulers.org

Foreign ministers
2017 in international relations

Foreign ministers
2017